Newcastle International Airport  is an international airport in Newcastle upon Tyne, England, UK. , Newcastle International handled just under 5.2 million passengers annually.

Newcastle Airport has a Civil Aviation Authority Public Use Aerodrome Licence (Number P725) that allows flights for the public transport of passengers or for flying instruction.

In 2019, it was named the best airport in Europe of those serving between 5m and 15m passengers annually by Airports Council International (ACI) for the second consecutive year.

Ownership
The airport is owned by seven local authorities (51%) and AMP Capital (49%). The seven local authorities are: City of Newcastle, City of Sunderland, Durham County Council, Gateshead MBC, North Tyneside MBC, Northumberland County Council, and South Tyneside MBC. In October 2012 Copenhagen Airport sold its stake in the airport to AMP Capital.

Area served
The airport mainly serves the counties of Tyne and Wear, County Durham, and Northumberland in North East England, as well as Cumbria in North West England, and the Scottish Borders area of southern Scotland. The airport competes with the smaller Teesside International Airport for passengers travelling from and to County Durham and the Teesside area of North Yorkshire. The nearest similar-sized airports are Edinburgh and Glasgow situated to the north.

History

Early years

The airport was opened on 26 July 1935 as Woolsington Aerodrome by the Secretary of State for Air, Sir Phillip Cunliffe-Lister. Incorporating a clubhouse, hangar, workshops, fuel garage and grass runway, it cost £35,000 to build. The airport became the base for the Newcastle upon Tyne Flying Club, which moved from its previous home at Cramlington Aerodrome and ran the new airport on behalf of the council. On 1 June 1939, No. 43 Elementary and Reserve Flying Training School, operated by Newcastle Flying Club and equipped with a mixture of de Havilland Tiger Moths, Miles Magisters and Hawker Hinds opened at Woolsington, as one of a large number of civil-operated flying schools set up to train aircrew for the RAF. The school was disbanded on 3 September 1939, with the outbreak of the Second World War.

In 1940, the airfield was occasionally used to operate detachments of Supermarine Spitfire fighters from RAF Acklington-based 72 Squadron.  On 25 July that year, No. 83 Maintenance Unit RAF, tasked with recovering crashed aircraft and salvaging any usable parts, was formed at Woolsington, remaining operational until April 1946. The airfield was also used as a base for the single Tiger Moth of the Durham University Air Squadron from February 1941, and from 1942 to 1943 by detachments from No. 278 Squadron RAF, operating Westland Lysander and Supermarine Walrus in the air sea rescue role. No. 281 Squadron RAF, another air sea rescue squadron, operated from Woolsington from June to October 1943, while from November 1943 to June 1945, the airfield was used as a satellite field for No. 62 OTU, based at RAF Ouston. Woolsington was handed back to the council in 1946.

In 1967, the construction of a new runway and terminal was completed, along with an apron and a new air traffic control tower. These new additions were officially opened by the Prime Minister, Harold Wilson on 17 February 1967.

In 1978, with passenger figures approaching one million per year, the airport was designated as a regional international hub airport in the UK government's White Paper on Airports Policy, opening the way for further redevelopment; in the same decade it was re-branded as Newcastle Airport. The 1980s saw further investment in check-in, catering and duty-free shops. In 1991, Airport Metro station opened, connecting the airport with Newcastle Newcastle City Centre and Sunderland using the Tyne and Wear Metro system.

Since the 2000s
In August 2004, an extended and refurbished Departure Terminal was opened. The refurbishment included a 3,000 square metre extension with new shops, cafes and 1,200 new seats for waiting passengers.

In 2006, a record 5.4 million passengers used the airport, according to Civil Aviation Authority figures.

Rapid expansion in passenger traffic has led to increasing commercial use of the south side of the airport. This was previously used for general aviation, but is now used for freight, mail and corporate flights. This is partially due to difficulties obtaining departure and arrival slots for light aircraft traffic, which need to be separated from larger aircraft to protect against wake turbulence. As part of the Airport Master Plan, the south-side area is to be expanded with maintenance facilities including new hangar and apron areas.

In January 2007 it was announced that Emirates were to begin a daily non-stop service to Dubai from the airport. This service started on 7 September 2007 and has operated ever since. Until 2012, the route was flown by an Airbus A330. Since September 2012 it has been flown by a Boeing 777.

In August 2016, United Airlines announced it would discontinue its seasonal route from Newark to Newcastle in 2017, citing economic reasons.

In July 2017, it was announced that the airport would be investing £3 million on a terminal expansion project which is part of overall £20 million improvement plans running from 2016 to 2017. This £20m improvement plan included a new radar system alongside digital signage in the check-in areas and the installation of new flooring. The £3m plan includes an extension to the terminal by 4,800 sq ft (450 m2) and will increase the equipment in the security hall, bringing in improved technology to speed up procedures there. This was due to be constructed over the winter of 2017/2018.

In August 2020, easyJet announced the closure of their crew base in Newcastle due to the financial difficulties from the COVID-19 pandemic which means that the airline only operates domestic flights from the airport after scrapping all of its international routes by 31 August 2020.

In March 2022, Ryanair opened its new base at Newcastle and announced 10 new routes which meant that the airline would operate a total of 19 routes, with over 130 weekly flights over Summer 2022 using two based aircraft.

Facilities 
Newcastle Airport Freight Village is south of the airport and includes Emirates SkyCargo, FedEx, and North East Air Cargo company offices which deal with freight exports and imports and mail. It also houses freight forwarding agents such as Casper Logistics Ltd, Kintetsu World Express, Kuehne + Nagel, Nippon Express, Schenker International, Davis Turner Air Cargo, and Universal Forwarding.

In April 2016, Emirates reported that flown exports have soared to £310m a year since the arrival of the Emirates service from Newcastle to Dubai. The Dubai route contributes some £600m to the economy and has opened unlimited export avenues to North East firms, some of whom have opened offices in the United Arab Emirates.

The airport is also home to the Newcastle Airport Fire Academy. The Newcastle Aviation Academy is also located within this area. When Gill Airways operated, its head office was in the New Aviation House, on the airport property. The south side of the airport also has bases for Great North Air Ambulance and the National Police Air Service. They normally have one respective helicopter based here at a time but are known to rotate their fleet around bases. The area also holds maintenance workshops for the airport and various other depots for airport-run services like Alpha Catering.

Airlines and destinations
The following airlines operate regular scheduled services to and from Newcastle upon Tyne:

Statistics 
The airport saw significant growth in the ten years to 2007, when passenger numbers peaked at 5.65 million, more than double the number handled ten years earlier. Passenger numbers declined in the subsequent four years due to the financial crisis of 2007–2010, but later recovered, with around 5.3 million passengers passing through the airport in 2018 (close to the 2006 total), although cargo volumes have broadly increased to record levels since 2005.

Traffic figures

Busiest routes

Accidents and incidents 
On 30 November 2000, a Piper Aerostar registered N64719 en route to Iceland from Newcastle International Airport, crashed close to Fortingall, on the north side of Loch Tay in Perthshire, Scotland, killing the single crewmember. The accident report concluded that the aircraft gradually lost airspeed during an icing encounter, before stalling and the pilot losing control.

Ground transport

Metro

The Newcastle Airport Metro station station is directly connected to the terminal through an indoor walkway. The station is the northern terminus of the green line, with frequent direct services to all the main Newcastle and Sunderland stations (approximately 20 and 50 minutes respectively).

Road transport
The airport is connected to the A1 trunk road by the A696 dual carriageway. A half-hourly bus service links the airport to the nearby villages of Ponteland and Darras Hall, as well as to the City Centre.

References

External links

 

Airports in England
Airports established in 1935
1935 establishments in England
Buildings and structures in Newcastle upon Tyne
Transport in Tyne and Wear
Transport in Newcastle upon Tyne
Airports in North East England